This article lists the members of the Presidency of Bosnia and Herzegovina since the country's new Constitution from December 1995, adopted following the Dayton Agreement. The Presidency of Bosnia and Herzegovina is composed of three members, each member representing one of three constitutive nations of Bosnia and Herzegovina: Bosniaks, Croats (elected from the Federation) and Serbs (elected from Republika Srpska).

List

Bosniak members

Croat members

Serb members

See also
Chairman of the Presidency of Bosnia and Herzegovina
List of members of the Presidency of Bosnia and Herzegovina by time in office
Triumvirate

References

External links
predsjednistvobih.ba in 

Politics of Bosnia and Herzegovina
Presidency of Bosnia and Herzegovina
Bosnia and Herzegovina politics-related lists